Norman Vanua (born 2 December 1993) is a Papua New Guinean cricketer. Vanua made his One Day International debut for Papua New Guinea on 9 November 2014 against Hong Kong in Australia. He made his Twenty20 International debut for Papua New Guinea against Ireland in the 2015 ICC World Twenty20 Qualifier tournament on 15 July 2015.

In August 2018, he was named in Papua New Guinea's squad for Group A of the 2018–19 ICC World Twenty20 East Asia-Pacific Qualifier tournament. In March 2019, he was named in Papua New Guinea's squad for the Regional Finals of the 2018–19 ICC World Twenty20 East Asia-Pacific Qualifier tournament. The following month, he was named in Papua New Guinea's squad for the 2019 ICC World Cricket League Division Two tournament in Namibia.

In June 2019, he was selected to represent the Papua New Guinea cricket team in the men's tournament at the 2019 Pacific Games. In September 2019, he was named in Papua New Guinea's squad for the 2019 ICC T20 World Cup Qualifier tournament in the United Arab Emirates. In Papua New Guinea's opening match of the tournament, against Bermuda, Vanua took a hat-trick.

In August 2021, Vanua was named in Papua New Guinea's squad for the 2021 ICC Men's T20 World Cup.

References

External links
 

1993 births
Living people
Papua New Guinean cricketers
Papua New Guinean sportsmen
Papua New Guinea One Day International cricketers
Papua New Guinea Twenty20 International cricketers
Place of birth missing (living people)
Twenty20 International hat-trick takers